Al Ahly TV is an Egyptian-Arab channel that currently Broadcast the football team's friendly matches, youth team matches and other sports matches. The channel was established in 2008, in cooperation with Arab Radio and Television Network. The official broadcast of the channel was launched on 12/3/2010 When former club president Hassan Hamdy announced the opening of the channel.

References

External links

2008 establishments in Egypt
Television stations in Egypt
Television channels and stations established in 2008
Arabic-language television stations
Football club television channels